North Paulding High School is a public high school in Dallas, Georgia, United States. The school mascot is the Wolf.

History

The school was built due to overcrowding in Paulding County. Paulding was listed as the eighth fastest growing county in the nation from 2000 to 2009, with a population growth from 81613 residents in 2000 to 136,655 in 2009. North Paulding was projected to open in 2008, but due to over-crowding in the nearby East Paulding High School, it opened a year early. In the school's first year, North Paulding only taught freshmen and had to use Sammy McClure Middle School as its teaching facility until the actual high school building opened in 2008. The school graduated its first senior class in 2011. Two other schools share a campus with North Paulding: Sammy McClure Middle School and Burnt Hickory Elementary School.

Administration
In 2018, Gabe Carmona, previously principal of Marietta High School, became the principal of North Paulding High School.

Conditions during the COVID-19 pandemic
In 2020, during the COVID-19 pandemic, the school was reportedly failing to follow CDC guidelines related to mask-wearing, and was accused of creating an unsafe environment for returning students. Principal Gabe Carmona said students would be punished if they publicly posted concerns about the school's COVID-19 response. At least two students were suspended for sharing photos of unsafe conditions within the school, though the suspension of one was later rescinded. Just a few days after the photos were shared, six students and three staff members were tested positive for COVID-19.

Academics
North Paulding High teaches grades 9–12. The school teaches on a block schedule, meaning the students take semester long classes. Many programs are offered in college prep and tech prep areas, including Business Education, Marketing Education, Construction Education, Automotive Technology Education, Engineering, Drafting and Design, Culinary Arts, Public Safety, Healthcare Science, and Cosmetology.

Just before the beginning of the 2011–2012 school year, the school secured a contract for an Army JROTC program. The students of the 2011–2012 school year were the first to take advantage of this program.

Extra-curricular activities and athletics
North Paulding offers many after-school clubs and organizations, as well as many athletic teams. Clubs include Chess, Chorus, Band, Beta, Drama, Foreign Language Club, FBLA, FCS, NHS, DECA, HOSA, FCCLA, Skills USA, and 4-H.

The school is a division AAAAAAA team region 5 in Georgia. Although it is a new school, North Paulding has many reputable sports teams.

Notable alumni

 Chris Conley - professional football player

References

Public high schools in Georgia (U.S. state)
Schools in Paulding County, Georgia